Vignale, also known as Carrozzeria Alfredo Vignale was an Italian automobile coachbuilding company active in Turin, 1948-1973.
 Vignale Gamine, a small rear-engined car produced by Vignale 1967-1971

Vignale may also refer to:
 Vignale, Haute-Corse,  a commune in the Haute-Corse department of France on the island of Corsica
 Vignale Monferrato, a comune (municipality) in the Province of Alessandria in the Italian region of Piedmont
 Damon Vignale (active from 1998), Canadian writer, director, and producer working in film and television
 Federico Callori di Vignale (1890-1971), Italian Cardinal of the Roman Catholic Church
 Giovanni Vignale (born 1957), Italian-born American physicist

See also